Nicolae Simatoc (also known as Miklós Szegedi; 1 May 1920 – 2 December 1979) was a Romanian football manager and player. A midfielder, he played for a number of clubs throughout Europe, including Ripensia Timişoara and Carmen București in Romania, Nagyváradi AC in Hungary, Inter Milan and Brescia in Italy, and Barcelona and Real Oviedo in Spain. After retiring as a player he became a coach, and managed Spanish side UE Lleida between 1959 and 1960, and CE Sabadell FC between 1960 and 1961. He then coached Budapest Sydney and Polonia Western Eagles.

Personal life
Simatoc was born to Romanian parents in Briceni, present-day Moldova. He was raised Romanian Orthodox by his family. He was also known as Miklós Szegedi while playing in Hungary. Simatoc was married to a Hungarian woman named Etelka Stolárcsik, with whom he had two sons. One of them, Silvio, born in 1950, had followed his father's footsteps and played in lower leagues in Spain and Australia.

Honours

Nagyváradi
Hungarian League: 1943–44

Barcelona
La Liga: 1951–52
Copa del Rey: 1951, 1952

References

External links

RSSSF – "Apolides" in Italy

1920 births
1979 deaths
People from Briceni District
Romanian footballers
Association football midfielders
Romania international footballers
Liga I players
La Liga players
Serie A players
Serie B players
Nemzeti Bajnokság I players
FC Ripensia Timișoara players
CA Oradea players
FC Carmen București players
Vasas SC players
Inter Milan players
Brescia Calcio players
FC Barcelona players
Real Oviedo players
Romanian football managers
Western Eagles FC managers
UE Lleida managers
AEL Limassol managers
CE Sabadell FC managers
Romanian expatriate footballers
Romanian expatriate football managers
Romanian expatriate sportspeople in Hungary
Expatriate footballers in Hungary
Romanian expatriate sportspeople in Italy
Expatriate footballers in Italy
Romanian expatriate sportspeople in Spain
Expatriate footballers in Spain
Expatriate football managers in Spain
Romanian expatriate sportspeople in Australia
Expatriate soccer managers in Australia
Romanian expatriate sportspeople in Cyprus
Expatriate football managers in Cyprus